The Colo Colo or Colocolo is an evil rat-like creature from Mapuche mythology. The marsupial monito del monte is sometimes called "colocolo" due to its similarity with the mythical beast.

Description 
The appearance of the Colo Colo varies depending on the region where the myth is told. Sometimes it is described as a feathered rat, sometimes as a snake or lizard with a rat's head, and occasionally it is just depicted as a huge rat. The Colo Colo falls under the mythical category of "Pillians".

Legend 
The Colo Colo hatches from an egg laid by a snake, and incubated by a rooster. After hatching, the Colo Colo will hide in a house, where it will feed on the saliva of the residents. If the Colo Colo feeds from a person, that individual will feel exhausted; if the Colo Colo is not stopped, the victim may even die. It is also said that this creature can provoke several serious diseases.

The Colo Colo can be detected if someone of the house is feeling tired for no reason, or because of its cry, which is similar to an infant wailing. When it is suspected that a Colo Colo is in the house, a Machi must be contacted to exorcise the premises. Sometimes the only remedy is burning the building in order to kill the Colo Colo.

See also 
Machi (shaman)
Mapuche
Mapuche religion

References 
Ernesto Wilhelm de Moesbach. Voz de Arauco: explicación de los nombres indígenas de Chile. Imprenta San Francisco, 1944

Indigenous South American legendary creatures
Mapuche legendary creatures
Mythological rodents